The Girl in the Show is a 1929 American comedy film directed by Edgar Selwyn and written by Edgar Selwyn and Joseph Farnham. The film stars Bessie Love, Raymond Hackett, Edward Nugent, Mary Doran, and Jed Prouty. The film was produced and distributed by Metro-Goldwyn-Mayer.

Plot 
A traveling Tom show is stranded in Kansas when their manager steals what meager funds they have. Hattie Hartley (Bessie Love), who plays Eva in the production, decides to marry the local undertaker, so that he will fund the troupe and pay for her younger sister's schooling. On the day of the wedding, the troupe is booked for a performance at the last minute. Hattie refuses to get married so that she can play the role of Eva, an act which reunites her with her true love, a member of their troupe.

Cast

Reception 
The film received negative reviews, with one reviewer claiming that people were yelling at the screen in the theater.

See also 
 Racism in early American film

References

External links

 
 
 
 

1929 films
1929 comedy films
American black-and-white films
American comedy films
American silent feature films
1920s English-language films
Films about actors
American films based on plays
Films directed by Edgar Selwyn
Films set in Kansas
Metro-Goldwyn-Mayer films
1920s American films
Silent American comedy films